Skinny Girl in Transit is a Nigerian Comedy webseries by NdaniTV. The first episode was released on NdaniTV's YouTube page on 16 Jul 2015. The idea for the series was pitched by Temi Balogun. The series returned to NdaniTV for its fifth season on November 9, 2018 after being on hiatus for over a year. The series returned again for the sixth season, the first episode of season 6 aired on February 14, 2020.

Plot summary

Skinny Girl in Transit is a web series produced by Ndani TV, and as the name implies, it is a comedy about a young Nigerian woman and her efforts to lose weight. In the pilot episode, Tiwalade, played by Abimbola Craig, is woken up from a pleasurable dream by her mother, played by Ngozi Nwosu. Her mum wastes no time in informing her that the Holy Spirit ministered to her and the message conveyed was that Tiwalade should lose weight, therefore furthering her hope of finding a husband. Tiwalade's mum performs a series of dramatic gestures and makes several grand statements to emotionally blackmail Tiwalade into agreeing to lose weight. And Tiwalade, who is aware that she is overweight, thinks ‘why not, how hard could it be? However, losing weight turns out to be more strenuous than she originally assumed. In addition, Tiwalade has to deal with a mother who is like a dog with a bone, a sister, played by Sharon Ooja, who is pretty, slim and shallow, and a love-life that is less than appealing.

Episodes 
 Season 1: 12 Episodes
 Season 2: 10 Episodes
 Season 3: 9 Episodes
 Season 4: 12 Episodes
 Season 5: 12 Episodes
 Season 6: 12 Episodes

Cast 

 Abimbola Craig as Tiwalade
 Ngozi Nwosu as Mama Tiwa
 Sharon Ooja as Shalewa
 Norbert Young as Baba Tiwa
 Kenneth Okolie as Femi
 Ayoola Ayolola as Mide
 Bisola Aiyeola as Didi
 Ini Dima-Okojie as Hadiza
Chioma Okoli as Wosilat
 Beverly Naya as Derin
 Timini Egbuson as Mohammed
 Sophie Alakija as Farida
 Nick Mutuma as Chris
 Ayo Adesanya as Aunty Dupe
 Deyemi Okanlawon as Pastor Braithwaite
James Gardiner as Kwame

References

External links
 Skinny Girl in Transit on nlist

Nigerian comedy television series
2010s Nigerian television series
2015 Nigerian television series debuts
Nigerian web series
Ndani TV original programming